Rastila metro station is a ground-level station on the M1 line of the Helsinki Metro. There are 134 bicycle and 34 car parking spaces at Rastila. It serves the residential areas of Meri-Rastila and Rastila in the district of Vuosaari, in East Helsinki.

The station was opened on 31 August 1998. It was designed by Irmeli Grundström and Juhani Vainio. The station is located 2.0 kilometers from the Puotila metro station, and 1.2 kilometers from the Vuosaari metro station.

References

External links

Helsinki Metro stations
Railway stations opened in 1998
1998 establishments in Finland
Vuosaari